Cerro Tanaro is a comune (municipality) in the Province of Asti in the Italian region Piedmont, located about  southeast of Turin and about  southeast of Asti.

Cerro Tanaro borders the following municipalities: Castello di Annone, Masio, Quattordio, and Rocchetta Tanaro.

References

External links
 Official website

Cities and towns in Piedmont